Albert Moll may refer to:
Albert Moll (Canadian psychiatrist), Canadian psychiatrist
Albert Moll (German psychiatrist) (1862–1939), German psychiatrist